The California Community Colleges is a postsecondary education system in the U.S. state of California. Despite its plural name, the system is consistently referred to in California law as a singular entity. The system includes the Board of Governors of the California Community Colleges and 73 community college districts. The districts currently operate 116 accredited colleges. The online college Calbright College is not accredited. The California Community Colleges is the largest system of higher education in the United States, and third largest system of higher education in the world, serving more than 1.8 million students.

Under the California Master Plan for Higher Education, the California Community Colleges is a part of the state's public higher education system, which also includes the University of California system and the California State University system. Like the two other systems, the CCCS is headed by an executive officer and a governing board. The 17-member Board of Governors (BOG) sets direction for the system and is in turn appointed by the California Governor. The board appoints the Chancellor, who is the chief executive officer of the system.  Locally elected Boards of Trustees work on the district level with Presidents who run the individual college campuses.

History

In 1907, the California State Legislature, seeing a benefit to society in education beyond high school but realizing the load could not be carried by existing colleges, authorized the state's high schools to create "junior colleges" to offer what were termed "postgraduate courses of study" similar to the courses offered in just the first two years of university studies.  A collegiate "department" of Fresno High School was set up in the fall of 1910.  This department later developed into Fresno City College, which is the oldest community college in California and the second oldest community college in the United States.

California was the leader of the American junior college movement: "In no other state was the vision of the junior college so vigorously pursued as in California." The United States went from zero junior colleges at the start of the 20th century to nineteen junior colleges by 1915, of which eight were based in California: Azusa, Bakersfield, Fresno, Fullerton, Rocklin, San Diego, Santa Ana, and Santa Barbara.

Thanks to the efforts of people such as Professor Alexis F. Lange, Dean of the School of Education at the University of California, Berkeley, the Junior College Act was passed in 1917.  The new law expanded the mission of the junior colleges by adding trade studies such as mechanical and industrial arts, household economy, agriculture, and commerce. In 1921, the Legislature authorized the creation of junior college districts separate from existing high school districts, in addition to the existing programs offered by high schools. In September 1921, Modesto Junior College (the 16th oldest community college in the United States) became the first junior college to be governed by a junior college district.  This was the beginning of junior colleges that continued to offer trade studies such as mechanical and industrial arts but now also included lower-division general education which was intended to serve as a basis for upper-division undergraduate study.  The first-ever junior college transfer student, from Modesto Junior College, transferred to Stanford in 1922.

By 1932 there were 38 junior colleges in the state.  The 1944 GI Bill dramatically increased college enrollments, and by 1950 there were 50 junior colleges.  By 1960 there were 56 districts in California offering junior college courses, and 28 of those districts were not high school districts but were junior college districts formed expressly for the governance of those schools.

The 1960 Master Plan for Higher Education was a turning point in higher education in California.  Under the Master Plan, as implemented through the Donahoe Higher Education Act, the UC and CSU systems were to limit their enrollments, yet an overall goal was to "provide an appropriate place in California public higher education for every student who is willing and able to benefit from attendance", meaning the junior colleges were to fulfill this role.  The Master Plan provided that junior colleges would be established within commuting distance of nearly all California residents, which required the founding of twenty-two new colleges on top of the sixty-four colleges already operating as of 1960.

The Master Plan refers only to "junior colleges" and does not use the term "community college."  During the 1960s, state senator Walter W. Stiern became increasingly vocal about the fact that the junior colleges were the only segment of California public higher education which had not yet been integrated into a statewide system, and proposed appropriate legislation to fix this.  In 1967, the Legislature with the concurrence of the Governor renamed the junior colleges to community colleges, created the Board of Governors for the Community Colleges to oversee the community colleges, and formally established the community college district system, requiring all areas of the state to be included within a community college district.  The degree of local control in this system, a side effect of the origins of many colleges within high school districts, can be seen in that 53 of the 73 districts (72%) govern only a single college; only a few districts in major metropolitan areas control more than four colleges. The Legislature also expressly expanded the mission of the community colleges to include vocational degree programs and continuing adult education programs.

The Master Plan for Higher Education also banned tuition, as it was based on the ideal that public higher education should be free to students (just like K-12 primary and secondary education).  As officially enacted, it states that public higher education "shall be tuition free to all residents."  Thus, California residents legally do not pay tuition.

However, the state has suffered severe budget deficits ever since the enacting of Proposition 13 in 1978, which led to the imposition of per-unit enrollment fees for California residents (equivalent in all but name to tuition) at all community colleges and all CSU and UC campuses to get around the legal ban on tuition.  Non-resident and international students, however, do pay tuition, which at community colleges is usually an additional $100 per unit (or credit) on top of the standard enrollment fee.  Since no other American state bans tuition in public higher education, this issue is unique to California. In summer 2010, the state's public higher education systems began investigating the possibility of dropping the semantic confusion and switching to the more accurate term, tuition.

In the past decade, tuition and fees have fluctuated with the state's budget. For much of the 1990s and early 2000s, enrollment fees ranged between $11 and $13 per credit. However, with the state's budget deficits in the early-to-mid 2000s, fees rose to $18 per unit in 2003, and, by 2004, reached $26 per unit. Since then, fees dropped to $20 per unit, down $6 from January 2007. It was the lowest enrollment fee of any college or university in the United States. On July 28, 2009, Governor Arnold Schwarzenegger signed AB2X (the education trailer bill to the 2009-10 state budget), setting the community college enrollment fee back at $26 per unit, effective for the fall 2009 term. In July 2011, per-unit fees at California's community colleges stood at $36 per unit. In summer 2012, fees were raised to $46 per unit.

Moreno Valley College and Norco College became the 111th and 112th colleges of the CCC system in 2010. Clovis Community College opened as the 113th college in 2015, and Compton College was re-established as the 114th college in 2017. In fall 2019, Calbright College was opened as an entirely online, but unaccredited, community college. The most recent in-person addition to the system is Madera Community College, which was recognized by the Board of Governors as the 116th accredited community college, on July 20, 2020.

Governance 

The system is governed by the Board of Governors which, within the bounds of state law, sets systemwide policy.  The 17 Board members, who represent the public, faculty, students, and classified employees, are appointed by the Governor of California as directed by Section 71000 of the California Education Code. The Board is also directed by the Education Code to allow local authority and control of the community college districts to the "maximum degree permissible" and AB 1725 in 1974 added a formal consultation process which has resulted in the formation of a Consultation Council to assure the Board of Governors and Chancellor's Office remain responsive in this respect.

The system is administered by the Chancellor's Office located in Sacramento, which is responsible for allocating state funding and provides leadership and technical assistance to the colleges. The Chancellor brings policy recommendations to the Board of Governors, and possesses the authority to implement the policies of the Board through his leadership of the Chancellor's Office.  The Chancellor plays a key role in the consultation process.

The CCC is a founding and charter member of CENIC, the Corporation for Education Network Initiatives in California, the nonprofit organization which provides extremely high-performance Internet-based networking to California's K-12 research and education community.

Student government

California Education Code § 76060 allows the governing board of a community college district to authorize the students of a college to organize a student body association. The student body association may conduct any activities, including fundraising activities, that is approved by the appropriate college officials. The governing board of the community college district may also authorize the students of a college to organize more than one student body association when the governing board finds that day students and evening students each need an association or geographic circumstances make the organization of only one student body association impractical or inconvenient.

Students have a right to participate. The BOG has established minimum standards governing procedures established by governing boards of community college districts to ensure faculty, staff, and students the right to participate effectively in district and college governance, and the opportunity to express their opinions at the campus level and to ensure that these opinions are given every reasonable consideration. The BOG standards state that the governing board of a community college district shall adopt policies and procedures that provide students the opportunity to participate effectively in district and college governance, including:

The governing body of the association may order that an election be held for the purpose of establishing a student representation fee of $1 per semester, and a student may, for religious, political, financial, or moral reasons, refuse to pay the student representation fee in writing at the time the student pays other fees. Regulations in the California Code of Regulations (CCR) require district governing boards to include information pertaining to the representation fee in the materials given to each student at registration, including its purpose, amount, and their right to refuse to pay the fee for religious, political, moral or financial reasons.

The students of this largest system of education in the world are represented through a statewide students' union known as the Student Senate for California Community Colleges (SSCCC). The SSCCC has a General Assembly composed of Delegates. Meetings of the General Assembly are held twice in each academic year. The Delegates are selected by community college-associated student organizations. The SSCCC also has a Student Senate Board of Directors composed of 10 Regional Affairs Directors, 10 Legislative Affairs Directors, and five Board Officers. The SSCCC has 10 regional subdivisions and each subdivision or "Region" annually elects two Directors. Meetings of the Student Senate Board of Directors are held about 12 times during each academic year.  The Student Senate Board of Directors may nominate students for appointment to seats on the Board of Governors and it may appoint two representatives to the Chancellor's Consultation Council.

Campuses

Students

The 1.8 million students of the California Community Colleges serve as the basis for the economic revitalization of California's workforce. Through its vocational endeavors, the CCC system has played a pivotal role in preparing nurses, firefighters, police, welders, auto mechanics, airplane mechanics, and construction workers to help mold the society of California. Career technical education (CTE), also known as vocational training, connects students to these career opportunities by providing industry-based skills.

In 2017, California sought to eliminate the lingering stigma around CTE. The state's goal was to train and place one million workers in middle-skill jobs, meaning jobs requiring some education beyond a high school diploma which may include a college credential, but not a four-year degree. A core barrier to the growth of CTE careers is the outdated view about the jobs being dirty and low paying. Annual events such as Manufacturing Day address these misperceptions of careers in the field by providing manufacturers an opportunity to bring middle and high school students into their facilities to display the skills required in certain fields. According to the World Economic Forum, more than half of the current workforce will need to be reskilled by 2022.

Enrollment

Faculty and staff

The California Community Colleges had a total employee headcount of 89,497 in fall 2006. While tenured and tenure tracked faculty were relatively well-compensated, they comprise a very small fraction of overall faculty compared to California's other two tertiary education systems. While 86% of CSU faculty members were tenured or tenure-tracked, only 30% of CCCS faculty were tenured or tenure-tracked. Temporary faculty, those who are not tenure tracked, earned an average of $62.86 per hour for those teaching for-credit courses, $47.46 for non-credit instruction, $54.93 for instructional support and $63.86 for "overload" instruction.

Staff and faculty compensation varied greatly by district. The overall average salary for tenured and tenure tracked faculty was $78,498 as of Fall 2006, with 48.7% earning more than $80,001. Salaries ranged from $64,883 in Siskiyous to $90,704 in Santa Barbara. The average for educational administrators was $116,855, while classified administrators earned an average of $87,886, classified professional earned $62,161 and classified support staff earned an average of $43,773.

Accreditation

In 2006, Compton College in Compton, California lost its accreditation. Arrangements were made to have the college's governance transferred to El Camino College, a neighboring college. Its new name, as a division of El Camino College, was "El Camino College Compton Center." Under El Camino College the "Center" was fully accredited. Compton College was re-established as a separate college in 2017.

In July 2013, City College of San Francisco was notified by its accreditor, the Accrediting Commission for Community and Junior Colleges (ACCJC), that its accreditation would be revoked in 2014 if the college failed an appeals process. Brice Harris, the systemwide chancellor of the California Community Colleges system, then appointed a "special trustee with extraordinary powers," an individual granted unilateral powers, to attempt to bring the college back into compliance with the ACCJC's accreditation standards. In January 2017, CCSF was reaffirmed of its accreditation for the full seven-year term by the ACCJC.

See also

University of California
California State University

References

Further reading

External links
California Community Colleges - Chancellor's Office
Academic Senate of California Community Colleges
Student Senate of California Community Colleges
Community College League of California
Foundation for California Community Colleges

 
Two-year colleges in the United States
 
Public university systems in the United States